Otter Bay (Baie de la Loutre) is a natural bay on the island of Newfoundland in the province of Newfoundland and Labrador, Canada. Coney Bay is east of it.

References

Bays of Newfoundland and Labrador